Amsterdam is an unincorporated community in Mercer County, in the U.S. state of Pennsylvania.

History
A large share of the early settlers being natives of the Netherlands caused the name Amsterdam to be selected.

References

Unincorporated communities in Pennsylvania
Unincorporated communities in Mercer County, Pennsylvania